The Fry Mountains are a mountain range in San Bernardino County, California.

References 

Mountain ranges of Southern California
Mountain ranges of San Bernardino County, California